Heartbeat (formerly Heartbreaker during production) is an American medical comedy-drama television series based on the real life of Dr. Kathy Magliato, as described in her book Heart Matters. It stars Melissa George as Alex Panttiere, a world-renowned heart-transplant surgeon at the fictional St. Matthew's Hospital in Los Angeles, who struggles to balance her personal and professional life. The series premiered on March 22, 2016, on NBC. On May 13, 2016 NBC canceled the series after one season.

Plot 
Alex Panttiere is a cardio-thoracic surgeon, and a very good one. She has just been appointed to a senior role at a major hospital. While this brings more responsibility, it does not dull her rebelliousness or unconventional methods.

Cast

Main
Melissa George as Dr. Alexandra Panttiere, the new Chief Innovation Officer (CIO) of St. Matthew's hospital, a cutting-edge research hospital. She has a very idiosyncratic personality, and is constantly dealing with demons from her past history at the hospital.
Dave Annable as Dr. Pierce Harrison, Alex's boyfriend and fellow surgeon.
Don Hany as Dr. Jesse Shane, chief of surgery at St. Matthews, and Alex's former mentor from when she interned at the hospital.
Shelley Conn as Dr. Millicent Silvano, hospital administrator. She is a stickler for procedure and the rules, much to Alex's chagrin.
Joshua Leonard as Max Elliot, Alex's gay ex-husband
Maya Erskine as Nurse Ji-Sung
D. L. Hughley as Dr. Myron Hackett, hospital psychiatrist
Jamie Kennedy as Dr. Casey Callahan, a surgeon in the hospital.
JLouis Mills as Dr. Forester, the resident anesthesiologist who is blind in one eye.

Recurring
Caitlyn Larimore as Lynn
Greyson Foster as  Gabrielle Elliot
Rudy Martinez as Marty
Adlu Fahrezy as Rudi

Episodes

Production
NBC picked up the pilot to series under the name Heartbreaker in May 2015.  The series was moved to a midseason release due to George's real-life pregnancy. In December 2015, NBC changed the title from Heartbreaker to Heartbeat. The pilot was filmed in Vancouver, British Columbia, with the remainder of the season filmed at Universal Studios in Hollywood.

Reception
Heartbeat has received negative reviews among critics. The review aggregator website Rotten Tomatoes reports a 17% approval rating. The site's critical consensus reads: "Heartbeat is a Frankensteined drama made up of hospital genre cliches and unlikable characters, though the cases-of-the-week are sporadically interesting." On Metacritic, the series holds a score of 37 out of 100 based on 22 reviews, indicating "generally unfavorable reviews."

Ratings

References

External links
 
 

2016 American television series debuts
2016 American television series endings
2010s American comedy-drama television series
2010s American LGBT-related comedy television series
2010s American LGBT-related drama television series
2010s American medical television series
English-language television shows
NBC original programming
Television shows based on non-fiction books
Television series by Universal Television
Television shows set in Los Angeles